Tree of Life is an album by American group Audiomachine, released on 16 July 2013. The album peaked at number two on the Billboard Top Classical Albums chart.

Track listing

Charts

References

External links
 
 

2013 albums
Audiomachine albums